Events in the year 1929 in Belgium.

Incumbents
Monarch – Albert I
Prime Minister – Henri Jaspar

Events
 5 January – Schelde dike breached; flooding around Dendermonde.
 February – Pierre Charles becomes European heavyweight champion.
 17 April – Rail disaster when Paris to Brussels Express runs into a goods train near Halle in thick mist.
 26 May – Legislative elections; Lucie Dujardin, on the Belgian Labour Party ticket in Liège, the first woman elected to parliament.
 9 June – Provincial elections
 31 August – Contract signed to return Belgian concession of Tianjin to direct Chinese rule (coming into effect March 1931).

Publications
 Hergé's The Adventures of Tintin first published in Le Petit Vingtième (10 January)
 Emile Vandervelde, Le pays d'Israel: un marxiste en Palestine (Paris, Rieder)

Art and architecture

Buildings
 Victor Horta, Palace of Fine Arts, Brussels (begun 1923)

Paintings
 René Magritte, La Trahison des images

Births
 8 April – Jacques Brel, entertainer (died 1978)
 2 June – Frédéric Devreese, composer (died 2020)
 8 July – Édouard Close, politician (died 2017).
 10 September – Lambert Kelchtermans, politician (died 2021)
 14 September – Jan Vansina, historian and anthropologist (died 2017).
 25 November – Marcel De Corte, footballer (died 2017).

Deaths
 24 August – Karel van de Woestijne, writer (born 1878)
 13 December – Philippe Wolfers, jeweller (born 1858)
 26 December – Albert Giraud, poet (born 1860)

References

 
1920s in Belgium
Belgium
Years of the 20th century in Belgium
Belgium